Jasper Haymond Colebank (February 28, 1887 – January 6, 1968) was an American college football player and coach. He served as the head coach at Fairmont State University in Fairmont, West Virginia form 1924 to 1932 and again from 1934 to 1939.  Colebank died on January 6, 1968, in Enterprise, West Virginia, of an apparent heart attack.

References

External links
 

1887 births
1968 deaths
Basketball coaches from West Virginia
Fairmont State Fighting Falcons athletic directors
Fairmont State Fighting Falcons football coaches
Fairmont State Fighting Falcons men's basketball coaches
West Virginia Mountaineers football players
High school football coaches in West Virginia

People from Preston County, West Virginia
Sportspeople from Fairmont, West Virginia